A Bit Patchy is a single by English DJ Switch. It is based on the 1973 recording of Apache, by Incredible Bongo Band. It was first released at the end of 2005 in discos and dance clubs, before arriving to the charts in 2006.

The song was then remixed by various artists, including Eric Prydz, Sinden and Sub Focus.

Charts
The single peaked at 11 in Spain for a week on 24 September 2006. In the UK, it appeared in the charts on 16 December 2006, peaking at number 103.

Reception
On 2 October 2005, Gilles Peterson rated "A Bit Patchy" the fourth best single in the Worldwide Tracks of the Year section of Worldwide Winners.

On 21 December 2005, Gregor Salto put the single in his top five dance singles of the year.

In popular culture
The song was featured in the 2011 William Hill betting advert in the UK.

A remix of the song was part of the tracklist for Anastacia by s.Oliver fashion show in Berlin, Germany, March 29, 2007.

References

2005 singles
2005 songs